Esther Davis (born 19 January 1970) is an Australian actress and singer, best known for her roles as Phryne Fisher in Miss Fisher's Murder Mysteries and its film adaptation, Miss Fisher & the Crypt of Tears, and as Amelia Vanek in The Babadook. Other major works include a recurring role as Lady Crane in season six of the television series Game of Thrones, Sister Iphigenia in Lambs of God, and the role of Ellen Kelly in Justin Kurzel's True History of the Kelly Gang.

Early life
Davis was born and brought up in Hobart, Tasmania. She is the daughter of local artist George Davis. She was educated at Clarence High School; Rosny College; the University of Tasmania, where she was a member of the Old Nick Company; and the National Institute of Dramatic Art (NIDA) in Sydney.

Career
Her acting career began with the Bell Shakespeare company when, straight out of NIDA, she was cast as Juliet in its 1993 production of Romeo and Juliet. She followed this with performances for the company in Hamlet and Richard III in 1993, and Macbeth and The Taming of the Shrew in 1994.

Davis's film career started with her role in the 1995 Australian film Dad and Dave: On Our Selection, which starred Geoffrey Rush, Leo McKern and Joan Sutherland. Film roles continued in The Matrix Reloaded and The Matrix Revolutions, director Richard Flanagan's 1998 Tasmanian film The Sound of One Hand Clapping, and Girl with a Pearl Earring.

After further stage performances in Australia, including Gwendolen Fairfax in a national tour of The Importance of Being Earnest in 2000 and The School for Scandal for the Sydney Theatre Company in 2001, in 2003 she won the Laurence Olivier Award for Best Supporting Actress for her performance as Stella Kowalski opposite Glenn Close in Trevor Nunn's production of Tennessee Williams play A Streetcar Named Desire at the National Theatre in London. In 2004 she starred in a Broadway production of Tom Stoppard's Jumpers at the Brooks Atkinson Theatre, for which she earned a Tony Award nomination. In 2005 she appeared as Mrs. Nellie Lovett in the BBC production of Sweeney Todd with Ray Winstone.

In the 2008 film, Hey, Hey, It's Esther Blueburger she plays Esther's controlling mother. Also in 2008, she appeared in the film Australia with Nicole Kidman and Hugh Jackman, directed by Baz Luhrmann. The same year, Davis played Maggie in Cat on a Hot Tin Roof for the Melbourne Theatre Company.

Davis returned to Tasmania to launch the Tasmanian Theatre Company in 2008 and help support local theatre while encouraging youth to continue participating in the arts. In 2011, she received a Logie Award nomination for her role as Anouk in the Australian miniseries The Slap. In 2012, 2013 and 2015, Davis played Phryne Fisher, the central character in ABC Television's high-rating costume drama Miss Fisher's Murder Mysteries.

Davis starred in Jennifer Kent's 2014 debut feature The Babadook. For her work in the film Davis was nominated for an AACTA Award for Best Actress in a Leading Role, an AACTA International Award for Best Actress and a Fangoria Chainsaw Award for Best Leading Actress.

In 2016, she joined the HBO series Game of Thrones in Season 6 as Lady Crane; this role did not continue into Season 7. In June 2016 she started filming The White Princess, playing Dowager Queen Elizabeth (Elizabeth Woodville). In early January 2017, the producers released a video clip from the series as a brief trailer (teaser).

In 2018, Davis filmed the mini-series Lambs of God for Foxtel, playing the role of Sister Iphigenia. It was released July 2019 in Australia and has been sold to 46 other territories. For her performance as Sister Iphigenia, Davis has been nominated for an AACTA Award for Best Lead Actress in a Drama Series.

Later the same year, Davis played Ellen Kelly in Justin Kurzel's True History of the Kelly Gang. The film premiered at the Toronto International Film Festival 11 September 2019 and was released in Australian cinemas in 2020 by Transmission Films. 

Also in 2018, Davis reprised her role of Phryne Fisher from the popular television series Miss Fisher's Murder Mysteries with a stand-alone action-adventure feature film, Miss Fisher and the Crypt of Tears With an AU$8m production budget, it wrapped production in late November 2018 and was released in cinemas in 2020.

In early 2019, Davis filmed the comedy-drama Babyteeth, playing the role of Anna. The film was selected to compete for the Golden Lion at the 76th Venice International Film Festival, where it had its world premiere on 4 September 2019.

In 2020, Davis finished filming The Justice of Bunny King, playing the title role. The film, co-starring Thomasin McKenzie, was shot in New Zealand.

Personal life 
Davis married Justin Kurzel in 2002. They have twin daughters.

Filmography

Film

Television

Awards and nominations

Film and television

Stage

References

External links

Article on Essie Davis
Essie launches new Tassie Theatre Company

1970 births
Living people
AACTA Award winners
Australian film actresses
Australian stage actresses
Australian television actresses
Actresses from Hobart
University of Tasmania alumni
National Institute of Dramatic Art alumni
20th-century Australian actresses
21st-century Australian actresses
Laurence Olivier Award winners
Best Supporting Actress AACTA Award winners